Jerome Craig Binnom-Williams (born 7 March 1995) is an English footballer who plays as a defender for Maidstone United.

Career
Binnom-Williams began his career with Crystal Palace and made his professional debut on 27 August 2013 in a 2–1 defeat against Bristol City in the Football League Cup. He joined Forest Green Rovers on a one-month loan deal in January 2014. He made his debut for the club on 9 January 2014 in a televised 1–1 draw with Hereford United.

On 11 September 2014, Binnom-Williams joined Southend United on a one-month loan deal, later extended, firstly by a further two months, and subsequently until the end of the 2014–15 season.

In May 2015, Binnom-Williams signed a new two-year contract with Crystal Palace.

In July 2015, he joined Burton Albion on a season-long loan. Williams was recalled by Crystal Palace in January 2016, having not played for Burton Albion since November.

In February 2016, Binnom-Williams joined Football League Two side Leyton Orient on loan until the end of the season.

On 2 August 2016, Binnom-Williams joined Football League One side Peterborough United on a free transfer.

After his contract at Peterborough was cancelled by mutual consent, Binnom-Williams signed a two-year deal with League Two side Chesterfield in June 2017. Binnom-Williams was released when his contract expired in May 2019.

In August 2019, Binnom-Williams signed for FC Halifax Town of the National League. He was released at the end of the season.

He signed for Barnet on 25 September 2020. He left the club at the end of the 2020–21 season having made 22 appearances.

Binnom-Williams joined Maidstone United in August 2021.

Career statistics

Club

References

External links

England profile at TheFA

Living people
1995 births
English footballers
Association football defenders
Crystal Palace F.C. players
Southend United F.C. players
Forest Green Rovers F.C. players
Leyton Orient F.C. players
Black British sportspeople
England youth international footballers
England semi-pro international footballers
National League (English football) players
English Football League players
Burton Albion F.C. players
Peterborough United F.C. players
Chesterfield F.C. players
FC Halifax Town players
Barnet F.C. players
Maidstone United F.C. players
Footballers from Croydon